The Football League play-offs for the 2007–08 season were held in May 2008, with the finals taking place at Wembley Stadium in London. The play-off semi-finals were played over two legs and were contested by the teams who finished in 3rd, 4th, 5th and 6th place in the Football League Championship and League One tables, and the 4th, 5th, 6th and 7th placed teams in League Two. The semi-final winners progressed to the finals, with the winner of each match earning promotion for the following season.

Hull City won promotion to the Premier League after defeating Bristol City in the Championship final, 1–0 with a goal from their leading scorer Dean Windass. This marked the Tigers' first entry to the top division of English football in their existence.

In the League One final, another 1–0 victory saw Doncaster Rovers promoted ahead of Leeds United. Stockport County defeated Rochdale 3–2 in the League Two final. This meant all three clubs who had finished immediately below the automatic promotion places in their divisions were promoted.

Background
The Football League play-offs have been held every year since 1987. They take place for each of the three Football League divisions following the conclusion of the regular season and are contested by the four clubs finishing immediately below the automatic promotion places.

In the Championship, Hull City finished four points behind second-placed Stoke City, who were promoted with champions West Bromwich Albion. Bristol City - who were aiming to return to the top flight for the first time since 1980 - finished in fourth place in their first season at Championship level for nine years. The other entrants, Crystal Palace and Watford, had both played in the Premier League before, with Palace's last spell in the top division ending in a final day relegation in 2005, a year after having won the play-offs. Watford had been relegated from the top flight in the previous season, having finished bottom, and were looking to return at the first attempt.

Championship

Semi-finals
First leg

Second leg

Bristol City won 4–2 on aggregate.

Hull City won 6–1 on aggregate.

Final

League One

 Leeds United were docked 15 points by the Football League due to the club not following Football League rules on clubs entering administration.

Semi-finals
First leg

Second leg

Leeds United won 3–2 on aggregate.

Doncaster Rovers won 5–1 on aggregate.

Final

League Two

Semi-finals
First leg

Second leg

Rochdale 3–3 Darlington on aggregate. Rochdale won 5–4 on penalties.

Stockport County won 2–1 on aggregate.

Final

References

External links
Football League website

 
English Football League play-offs
play-offs
May 2008 sports events in Europe